The 2004 Football League Trophy Final was the 21st final of the domestic football cup competition for teams from Football Leagues One, Two and The Conference, the Football League Trophy. The final was played at Millennium Stadium in Cardiff on 21 March 2004. The match was contested between Blackpool and Southend United. Blackpool won the match 2–0 with goals from John Murphy and Danny Coid.

Match details

References

External links
Official website
Match Details

 

2004
Southend United F.C. matches
Blackpool F.C. matches
Trophy